George Miles Chilcott (January 2, 1828 – March 6, 1891) was a delegate to the United States House of Representatives from the Territory of Colorado, and a United States senator from the State of Colorado.

He was born in Huntingdon County, Pennsylvania near Cassville.  In 1844, moved with his parents to Jefferson County, Iowa.  There he studied medicine for a short time, until 1850, but adopted the life of a farmer and stock raiser. He became sheriff of Jefferson County in 1853.

He moved to the Territory of Nebraska in 1856.  He was elected a member of the Nebraska Territorial Legislature from Burt County in 1856. He left the Nebraska legislature in 1859 when he moved to the Territory of Colorado.

In Colorado, he was a member of the constitutional convention and of the territorial legislature during the first two sessions, 1861-1862.  He studied law and was admitted to the bar in 1863.  Between 1863 and 1867, he was register of the United States Land Office for the Colorado district.

In 1865, he was elected to the U.S. House of Representatives, but was not admitted. In 1866, he was again elected, and served a term as a Republican Delegate to the Fortieth Congress.  Later, he joined the Territorial council for two years, between 1872 and 1874.

Colorado was admitted as a state in 1876, and he became a member of the Colorado House of Representatives in 1878. On April 11, 1882, was appointed to the United States Senate to fill the vacancy caused by the resignation of Henry M. Teller, thus becoming part of the Forty-seventh Congress as a Republican.  The term expired in 1883, and after serving the short year he retired from public service.

He died in St. Louis, Missouri on March 6, 1891.  He was laid to rest in Masonic Cemetery, Pueblo, Colorado.

References

External links

1828 births
1891 deaths
People from Huntingdon County, Pennsylvania
Delegates to the United States House of Representatives from Colorado Territory
Republican Party United States senators from Colorado
Members of the Nebraska Territorial Legislature
Members of the Colorado Territorial Legislature
Republican Party members of the Colorado House of Representatives
19th-century American politicians